Mortuary (also known internationally as Embalmed and Hall of Death) is a 1983 American slasher film directed by Howard Avedis and starred Bill Paxton, Mary Beth McDonough, David Wallace, Lynda Day George, with Michael Berryman (who only appears in the film's trailer) and Christopher George in his final film role before his death.

The film was released in 1983, and has grossed $4.3 million. Mortuary was officially released on DVD for the first time on May 25, 2012, followed by a limited Blu-ray release on October 7, 2014.

Plot
Wealthy psychiatrist Dr. Parson is bludgeoned and drowned in his pool, an incident his daughter Christie believes was murder, but which her mother Eve insists was an accident. Several weeks later, Josh, an ex-employee at a local mortuary, sneaks into the mortuary warehouse with Christie's boyfriend Greg, planning to steal tires as compensation for unpaid wages from his boss, Hank Andrews. Inside, the two men observe an occult sabbath, which Josh is impervious to, having been fired for witnessing one before. While retrieving the tires, Josh is stabbed to death with a trocar by a cloaked assailant. Shortly after, Greg observes Josh's van speed away.

Later that night, Greg and Christie search for Josh at the local roller skating rink, but cannot find him. The following day, Christie is pursued by a car en route to her family's secluded coastal mansion. After an argument with her mother, Christie is accosted by a hooded figure at the pool. She flees into the house, and Eve assures her it was only a dream. The next day, Greg confesses to Christie that he saw Eve in attendance at the sabbath he witnessed at the mortuary. Christie suspects her mother and Hank, whom Eve began dating only weeks after her husband's death, may have murdered Christie's father, and are orchestrating a plot to drive her insane.

Meanwhile, Paul, Hank's son and an embalmer at the mortuary, vies for Christie's attention. She and Greg dismiss his eccentricities on his mentally-ill mother's recent suicide. That night, Greg and Christie spend time alone in her home, but are subjected to various electronic interruptions, such as lights turning on and off, and the stereo playing by itself. The next day, Greg and Christie follow Eve to the mortuary, where they observe her engaging in a séance, attempting to contact her late husband. That night, Christie is attacked by a cloaked figure resembling Paul, and smashes a glass window, startling her mother. Eve assumes it to have been a nightmare, but asks Christie if the alleged attacker could have been Paul; she explains that Paul was a patient of Christie's father, and that he had been obsessed with her.

After Christie and Eve return to their bedrooms, a cloaked figure viciously stabs Eve to death while she lays in bed. The assailant, revealed to be Paul donning a white latex mask, chases Christie through the house. He attempts to stab her, but she unmasks him before he renders her unconscious. He brings her to the mortuary, where he begins the process of embalming her alive, but is stopped when Hank arrives. Paul explains that he had to "punish" Eve for telling Christie about his psychiatric condition, and that he had murdered Dr. Parson for previously having him incarcerated. Paul stabs his father in a rage, killing him, before being confronted by Greg, who has come searching for Christie. Paul manages to lock Greg in the embalming room.

Paul takes Christie and the corpses of Eve and his father to the warehouse, where he has arranged a makeshift wedding ceremony for himself and Christie. Surrounded by the preserved bodies of his victims, Paul pretends to conduct a Mozart symphony; among them is the body of Paul's mother, whose death he faked and whom he has induced into a coma. As he attempts to cut Christie's throat with a scalpel, Paul is attacked by Greg, who has broken free and armed himself with an axe. In the mélee, Christie begins to sleepwalk, and proceeds to take the axe and drive it into Paul's back, killing him. Greg and Christie embrace, before Mrs. Andrews suddenly awakens from her coma, lunging at the couple with a knife.

Cast

Production

Release

Box office
Mortuary opened in Virginia on July 8, 1983 before opening in Los Angeles on September 6, 1983. The total gross of Mortuary was $4,319,001.

Home media
On May 15, 2012, the film was finally transferred to DVD with a 16×9 (1.78:1) HD master from the original inter-negative. Scorpion Releasing, in conjunction with Camelot Entertainment, released the DVD with special features. The special features included play with or without the "Nightmare Theater" experience, on camera interview with composer John Cacavas and the original trailer.

On October 7, 2014, Scorpion Releasing released the film on Blu-ray in a limited edition with only 1,200 copies.

Reception

Linda Gross of the Los Angeles Times praised Mortuary as a "sick, scary slasher movie," though conceded that the screenplay "goes overboard on the gore." Gross also praised Gary Graver's cinematography as "classy, and at times, very beautiful." Henry Edgar of the Daily Press praised the film as well-crafted, writing: "Mortuary is rare among horror films. Even though the script leaves a few holes, the dialogue is mostly natural and the director keeps the motion moving at a quick pace."

References

External links
 
 
 

1983 films
1983 horror films
1980s horror thriller films
1983 independent films
1980s mystery films
1980s serial killer films
1980s slasher films
1980s teen horror films
American slasher films
American mystery films
American teen horror films
American serial killer films
American independent films
1980s English-language films
Funeral homes in fiction
1980s American films